Pierce Township is a township in Texas County, in the U.S. state of Missouri.

Pierce Township was first called "Jack's Fork Township", and under the latter name was established in 1852, and named after the creek of the same name within its borders.  The present name, adopted in 1854, honors J. W. Pierce, a pioneer citizen.

References

Townships in Missouri
Townships in Texas County, Missouri